The Piscataquis River is a major tributary of the Penobscot River, found in Piscataquis County, Maine, United States. It starts from the confluence of its East Branch and West Branch in Blanchard. The river flows in a mostly eastern direction until it meets the Penobscot at Howland.

The United States government maintains three river flow gauges on the Piscataquis river.

The Appalachian Trail runs along the West Branch of the Piscataquis, crossing the East Branch just upstream from their joining. The river is impounded by the Howland Dam at its confluence with the Penobscot River.

External links

 Real-time flow data for the Blanchard, Dover-Foxcroft, or Medford flow gages.
River elevation tables
National Weather Service forecast of river levels and flow.

References

Rivers of Penobscot County, Maine
Rivers of Piscataquis County, Maine
Tributaries of the Penobscot River
North Maine Woods
Rivers of Maine